General Post Office is a colonial-era landmark in Yangon, Myanmar (formerly Rangoon, Burma), designated in the Yangon City Heritage List. The building, located on the corner of Bo Aung Kyaw Street and Strand Road in Kyauktada Township, houses the central post office of Yangon. 

General Post Office was built in 1908 by AC Martin & Company, and housed the headquarters of Bulloch Brothers & Company, a Scottish rice trading firm founded by James and George Bulloch. The company was liquidated in 1933, and was subsequently acquired and repurposed in 1936 by the colonial government as the general post office for Rangoon. 

The building is noted for its lancet arched windows, its beaux-Arts portico, ornate stucco work, and foyer.

References

External links

Government buildings in Myanmar
Buildings and structures in Yangon
Government buildings completed in 1908
Post office buildings in Myanmar